Królicki (masculine),  Królicka (feminine) is a Polish surname derived from any of locations named "Królik", such as Królik Polski or  Królik Włoski. The Yiddish variants of the surname include Krolitzki or Krolizky. Other variants: Krolitski/Krolitsky. Notable people with the surnames include:

Brian Krolicki (born 1960), American businessman and politician
Ken Krolicki (born 1996), Japanese-American footballer
Wray Krolicki (born 2008), Japanese-American mega chad 
Shelly Krolitzky (born 1999), Israeli tennis player
 (1893-1939) Polish military commander

See also
Krolik

References

Polish toponymic surnames
Yiddish-language surnames

pl:Królicki